Innervillgraten is a municipality in the district of Lienz in the Austrian state of Tyrol. The region is one of the most remote regions in Austria. A year-long connection to the valley was established as late as 1956. The death of Pius Walder, a wood cutter and poacher, who had been shot by Johann Schett, lead to some touristic and media interest.

Population

References

Cities and towns in Lienz District